Gollner is a surname. Notable people with the surname include:

Adam Gollner (born 1976), Canadian writer and musician 
Manfred Gollner (born 1990),  Austrian footballer 
Monika Gollner (born 1974), Austrian high jumper
Theodor Gollner (born 1929), German musicologist